Dilson Neves Quaresma, simply known as Dilson, is a São Toméan footballer who plays as a left back for UDRA and the São Tomé and Príncipe national team.

Club career
On 13 January 2019, Dilson joined Equatorial Guinean Liga Nacional de Fútbol club Cano Sport Academy.

International career
Dilson made his international debut for São Tomé and Príncipe in 2017.

References

Date of birth uncertain
1990s births
Living people
Association football fullbacks
São Tomé and Príncipe footballers
São Tomé and Príncipe international footballers
Cano Sport Academy players
São Tomé and Príncipe expatriate footballers
São Tomé and Príncipe expatriate sportspeople in Equatorial Guinea
Expatriate footballers in Equatorial Guinea
Year of birth missing (living people)